Abdul Khaleque is a Bangladesh Nationalist Party politician and the former Member of Parliament of Brahmanbaria-6.

Career
Khaleque was elected to parliament from Brahmanbaria-6 as a Bangladesh Nationalist Party candidate in 2001.

References

Bangladesh Nationalist Party politicians
Living people
8th Jatiya Sangsad members
People from Brahmanbaria district
Year of birth missing (living people)